The 1968 Belgian Grand Prix was a Formula One motor race held at the Spa-Francorchamps Circuit on 9 June 1968. It was race 4 of 12 in both the 1968 World Championship of Drivers and the 1968 International Cup for Formula One Manufacturers. The 28-lap race was won by McLaren driver Bruce McLaren after he started from sixth position. Pedro Rodríguez finished second for the BRM team and Ferrari driver Jacky Ickx came in third.

On the seventh lap Brian Redman went off the circuit when his suspension failed and he crashed into and over a concrete barrier and into a parked car. His Cooper caught fire but Redman escaped with a severely broken right arm and a few minor burns.

Background 
After the introduction of 'dive plane' wings on the nosecone on an F1 car by Lotus at the previous race, the 1968 Monaco Grand Prix, Ferrari added a strut mounted negative incidence wing - to their lead driver Chris Amon's car and he nabbed pole position, and was 4 seconds faster in qualifying than the next fastest car of Jackie Stewart, though Amon claimed to have performed similar lap times without the wings. Amon's teammate Jacky Ickx did not have wings on his car. The Brabham team also fitted a rear wing to Jack Brabham's car, paired with dive planes on the nose to counteract lift; he qualified 10th. Wings were added to Ickx's car (and many other teams copied the idea for their cars) for the next race, the 1968 Dutch Grand Prix at Zandvoort. As 1968 season progressed many F1 teams utilized strut mounted wings attached directly to suspension elements - copying Chaparral sports car practice - to increase cornering speeds, reducing lap times. Ferrari never utilized strut mounted wings attached to suspension, as Enzo Ferrari considered it far too dangerous, continuing with strut mounted wings mounted directly to the chassis.

Classification

Qualifying

Race

Championship standings after the race 

Drivers' Championship standings

Constructors' Championship standings

Note: Only the top five positions are included for both sets of standings.

References

Further reading

 
 

Belgian Grand Prix
Belgian Grand Prix
Grand Prix
June 1968 sports events in Europe